Judith Noemí Freidenberg is an Argentine writer, professor and anthropologist.

She lives in the United States.

References 

Argentine emigrants to the United States
Argentine women writers
Writers from Buenos Aires
Living people
Year of birth missing (living people)